Abagrotis glenni is a species of moth in the family Noctuidae. It is found in western North America from British Columbia to California and Utah.

The wingspan is about 33 mm. Adults are on wing from April to May.

The larvae feed on Juniperus scopulorum and Thuja plicata.

External links
Species info
Macromoths of Northwest Forests and Woodlands

glenni
Moths of North America
Moths described in 1968